Margolis is a surname that, like its variants shown below, is derived from the Ashkenazi Hebrew pronunciation of the Hebrew word  (Israeli Hebrew [maɹgalit]), meaning 'pearl,' and may refer to:

Alisa Margolis, Ukrainian artist based in Berlin
Barbara Margolis (1929–2009), prisoners' rights advocate and official greeter of New York City
Char Margolis, American spiritualist
Cindy Margolis (born 1965), American model
David Margolis (industrialist) (1930–2008), American industrialist
Ephraim Zalman Margolis (1762–1828), Galician rabbi born in Brody
Eric Margolis (journalist), journalist
Eric Margolis (sociologist), American sociologist at the Arizona State University. 
Esther Margolis, president of Newmarket Publishing and Communications and Newmarket Press
Gavriel Zev Margolis (1847–1935), Orthodox rabbi in the United States
Gwen Margolis (1934–2020), American politician
Helen Margolis, British physicist
Henry M. Margolis (1909–1989), New York industrialist, theatrical producer, and philanthropist
Howard Margolis (1932–2009), American social scientist
Jack S. Margolis, author of several books about recreational drugs
Jane Margolis, American social scientist
James Margolis (born 1936), American Olympic fencer
Joseph Margolis (1924–2021), American philosopher
Judith Margolis (born 1944), Israel-based American artist
Kitty Margolis (born 1955), American jazz singer
Lawrence S. Margolis (1935–2017), American judge
Leo Margolis (1927–1997), Canadian parasitologist
Mark Margolis (born 1939), American actor
Max Margolis (1866–1932), Lithuanian-born American philologist
Maxine Margolis, American anthropologist
Rachel Margolis, Ph.D., author of A Partisan from Vilna
Seth Margolis, novelist
Zoe Margolis (born 1972), blogger of Girl with a One-Track Mind
Al Margolis, noise music artist known by the pseudonym If, Bwana
Barbara Margolis, maiden name of Barbara Roche (born 1954), UK Labour politician
Reid Margolis or DJ Reid Speed, drum and bass and 2-step DJ from New York City
Thad Margolis - founder and CEO of Vitahard

See also 
 Margoles
 Margolies
 Margolin
 Margoliouth
 Margolus
 Margules
 Margulies
 Margulis
 Miriam Margolyes
 Pearl (surname)

Jewish surnames
Hebrew-language surnames